Shalini Kapoor Sagar is an Indian television and theatre actress.

Personal life
Kapoor is married to Rohit Sagar, a theatre and television actor. The couple gave birth to their daughter, Aadya in February 2011.

Career
Kapoor debuted with a Dubai-based television show titled Dastaan. Her works include Om Namah Shivay, Vishnu Puran, Ramayan, Jai Maa Durga, Devon Ke Dev...Mahadev, Qubool Hai, Swaragini and Kahaan Hum Kahaan Tum.

Filmography

Films

Television

Web series

References

External links
 
 

Year of birth missing (living people)
Living people
Indian stage actresses
Indian film actresses
Indian television actresses
Actresses in Hindi cinema
Actresses from Kolkata
Actresses in Hindi television
21st-century Indian actresses